This is a list of governors of former Nigerian states.

Bendel State

Gongola State

Western State

See also
These are all Nigerian governors and so on.....

State governors